Mary-Ann Lindelwa Dunjwa is a South African politician from the Eastern Cape. A member of the African National Congress, she was elected to the National Assembly in 2009. After her re-election in 2014, she became the Chairperson of the Portfolio Committee on Health, a position she held until 2019, when she was elected Chairperson of the Portfolio Committee on Employment and Labour.

Political career
Dunjwa is a member of the African National Congress. Prior to the 2009 general election, she was ranked 17th on the ANC's regional-to-national list. At the election, she won a seat in the National Assembly. She was a member of the  Portfolio Committee on Science and Technology, a party whip, and the ANC's constituency contact for its Greenbushes constituency office during the 2009–2014 parliamentary term.

Dunjwa was significantly moved up on the ANC's regional-to-national list for the 2014 general election. She topped  the list, meaning that she was easily re-elected to parliament at the election. She was then elected chairperson of the Portfolio Committee on Health. In August 2015, Dunjwa voted for a report by the Minister of Police, Nathi Nhleko that exonerated President Jacob Zuma of paying any money towards the controversial multimillion-rand upgrades at the Nkandla homestead, his private home in KwaZulu-Natal.

For the 2019 general election, Dunjwa was 6th on the ANC's regional-to-national list. She was re-elected at the election and was then elected Chairperson of the newly established Portfolio Committee on Employment and Labour.

References

Living people
Year of birth missing (living people)
Xhosa people
People from the Eastern Cape
African National Congress politicians
Members of the National Assembly of South Africa
Women members of the National Assembly of South Africa